Charles Friedel (12 March 1832 – 20 April 1899) was a French chemist and mineralogist.

Life
A native of Strasbourg, France, he was a student of Louis Pasteur at the Sorbonne. In 1876, he became a professor of chemistry and mineralogy at the Sorbonne.

Friedel developed the Friedel-Crafts alkylation and acylation reactions with James Crafts in 1877, and attempted to make synthetic diamonds.

His son Georges Friedel (1865–1933) also became a renowned mineralogist.

Lineage 
 Friedel's wife's father was the engineer, Charles Combes. The Friedel family is a rich lineage of French scientists:
 Georges Friedel (1865–1933), French crystallographer and mineralogist; son of Charles
 Edmond Friedel (1895–1972), French Polytechnician and mining engineer, founder of BRGM, the French geological survey; son of Georges
 Jacques Friedel (1921–2014), French physicist; son of Edmond (fr)

References

Further reading

External links

 
 Charles Friedel

1832 births
1899 deaths
Scientists from Strasbourg
Academic staff of the University of Paris
19th-century French chemists
French mineralogists
Members of the French Academy of Sciences
Corresponding members of the Saint Petersburg Academy of Sciences